Henry XVI of Bavaria (1386 – 30 July 1450, in Landshut),, since 1393 Duke of Bavaria-Landshut. He was a son of duke Frederick and his wife Maddalena Visconti, a daughter of Bernabò Visconti.

Life
Duke Henry XVI was the first of the three famous rich dukes, who reigned Bavaria-Landshut in the 15th century. Their residence was Trausnitz Castle in Landshut, a fortification which attained enormous dimensions.  Having inherited not only the black hair but also the despotic temperament of the Visconti, Henry oppressed very cruelly uprisings of the citizenry of Landshut in 1410 and fought successfully against his cousin Louis VII the Bearded, the duke of Bavaria-Ingolstadt. He united Louis’ enemies in the Parakeet Society of 1414 and the League of Constance of 1415.

While the duchy of Bavaria-Straubing was still divided between Bavaria-Ingolstadt, Bavaria-Munich and Bavaria-Landshut after the extinction of the dukes of Straubing in 1429, Henry managed to receive the duchy of Bavaria-Ingolstadt almost completely in 1447. Henry died in 1450, it is not sure if the plague was the cause as sometimes reported. He was succeeded by his only surviving son Louis IX the Rich.

Henry banished his wife to Burghausen Castle to extend his freedom. His son and grandson took over this tradition, even though not all later marriages were that unhappy.

Family and children

He was married in Landshut 25 November 1412 to Margaret, daughter of Duke Albert IV  of Austria and Joanna Sophia of Bavaria. Their children were:
 Albert (1414, Burghausen – ca. 1418)..
 Frederick (1415 – 7 June 1416, Burghausen).
 Louis IX (23 February 1417, Burghausen – 18 January 1479, Landshut).
 Joanna (1413 – 20 July 1444, Mosbach), married in Burghausen in 1430 to Count Palatine Otto I of Mosbach.
 Elizabeth (1419 – 1 January 1451, Landshut), married in Stuttgart 1445 to Ulrich V, Count of Württemberg.
 Margaret (b. 1420), a nun at Seligental.

He also had illegitimate children, including Georg von Zangberg, Elisabeth and Barbara.

1386 births
1450 deaths
14th-century dukes of Bavaria
15th-century dukes of Bavaria
House of Wittelsbach
Medieval child monarchs